The Mersin Marathon is an annual road running event over the marathon distance, which is held in December in Mersin in Mersin Province Turkey. The event also features a 15-kilometre race.

Mersin Marathon was established in 2015 and it is hosted by the Mersin Metropolitan Municipality.

Past winners
Key:

References

External links
Official website

Marathons in Turkey
Sport in Mersin
2015 establishments in Turkey
Recurring sporting events established in 2015
Annual events in Turkey
Winter events in Turkey